Hometown Life is the second solo studio album by American rock musician Sully Erna, released on September 30, 2016.

Track listing

Hometown Sessions 
 Unforgettable
 TSF

Personnel
 Sully Erna - lead vocals, piano, acoustic guitar, producer
 Tim Theriault - guitar, backing vocals
 Chris Decato - keyboards, backing vocals
 Chris Lester - bass, acoustic guitar, backing vocals
 David Stefanelli - drums
 Irina Chirkova - cello
 Lisa Guyer - vocals
 Sal Erna, Matt Langley, Zach Lange, Kendall Moore - horns on "Turn it Up!"

Charts

References

External links
https://itunes.apple.com/us/album/hometown-life/id1139643174

2016 albums
Sully Erna albums